Mary Lake is a lake in Clearwater County and Hubbard County, Minnesota, in the United States.

Mary Lake was named for Mary Turnbull, the wife of a government surveyor.

See also
List of lakes in Minnesota

References

Lakes of Minnesota
Lakes of Clearwater County, Minnesota
Lakes of Hubbard County, Minnesota